Galileo Ferraris was the name of at least two ships of the Italian Navy and may refer to:

 , a  launched in 1913 and discarded in 1919.
 , an  launched in 1934 and lost in 1941.

Italian Navy ship names